Portugal participated in the Eurovision Song Contest 2019 with the song "Telemóveis" written and performed by Conan Osíris. The Portuguese broadcaster  (RTP) organised the national final  2019 in order to select the Portuguese entry for the 2019 contest in Tel Aviv, Israel. After two semi-finals and a final which took place in February and March 2019, "Telemóveis" performed by Conan Osíris emerged as the winner after achieving the highest score following the combination of votes from seven regional juries and a public televote.

Portugal was drawn to compete in the first semi-final of the Eurovision Song Contest which took place on 14 May 2019. Performing during the show in position 15, "" was not announced among the top 10 entries of the first semi-final and therefore did not qualify to compete in the final. It was later revealed that Portugal placed fifteenth out of the 17 participating countries in the semi-final with 51 points.

Background 

Prior to the 2019 contest, Portugal had participated in the Eurovision Song Contest fifty times since its first entry in 1964. Portugal had won the contest on one occasion: in 2017 with the song "" performed by Salvador Sobral. Following the introduction of semi-finals for the 2004, Portugal had featured in only five finals. Portugal's least successful result has been last place, which they have achieved on four occasions, most recently in 2018 with the song "" performed by Cláudia Pascoal. Portugal has also received nul points on two occasions; in 1964 and 1997.

The Portuguese national broadcaster,  (RTP), broadcasts the event within Portugal and organises the selection process for the nation's entry. RTP confirmed Portugal's participation in the 2019 Eurovision Song Contest on 17 September 2018. The broadcaster has traditionally selected the Portuguese entry for the Eurovision Song Contest via the music competition , with exceptions in 1988 and 2005 when the Portuguese entries were internally selected. Along with their participation confirmation, the broadcaster revealed details regarding their selection procedure and announced the organization of  2019 in order to select the 2019 Portuguese entry.

Before Eurovision

Festival da Canção 2019 

 2019 was the 53rd edition of  that selected Portugal's entry for the Eurovision Song Contest 2019. Sixteen entries competed in the competition that consisted of two semi-finals held on 16 and 23 February 2019 leading to an eight-song final on 2 March 2019.

Format 
The format of the competition consisted of three shows: two semi-finals on 16 and 23 February 2019 and the final on 2 March 2019. Each semi-final featured eight competing entries from which four advanced from each show to complete the eight song lineup in the final. Results during the semi-finals were determined by the 50/50 combination of votes from a jury panel appointed by RTP and public televoting, while results during the final were determined by the 50/50 combination of votes from seven regional juries and public televoting, which was opened following the second semi-final and closed during the final show. Both the public televote and the juries assigned points from 3-8, 10 and 12 based on the ranking developed by both streams of voting.

Competing entries 
Sixteen composers were selected by RTP through three methods: fourteen nominated by  presenter Henrique Amaro and invited by RTP for the competition, one selected from over 200 submissions received through an open call for songs and one selected from the  radio show MasterClass featuring composers without any published work. The composers, which both created the songs and selected its performers, were required to submit the demo and final versions of their entries by 30 November and 31 December 2018, respectively. Songs could be submitted in any language. The selected composers were revealed on 5 December 2018, while the competing artists were revealed on 21 January 2019.

Shows

Semi-finals
The two semi-finals took place at RTP's Studio 1 in Lisbon on 16 and 23 February 2019. The first semi-final was hosted by Sónia Araújo and Tânia Ribas de Oliveira while the second semi-final was hosted by José Carlos Malato and Jorge Gabriel. In each semi-final eight entries competed and four advanced to the final based on the 50/50 combination of votes of a jury panel consisting of Júlio Isidro, Álvaro Costa, Isaura, Maria João, Pedro Penim, Rita Redshoes and Selma Uamusse, and a public televote.

In addition to the performances of the competing entries, Cais Sodré Funk Connection together with Portuguese Eurovision 1964 entrant António Calvário and Portuguese Eurovision 1967 entrant Eduardo Nascimento performed as the interval act in the first semi-final, while Kumpania Algazarra performed as the interval act in the second semi-final.

Final
The final took place at the Portimão Arena in Portimão on 2 March 2019, hosted by Filomena Cautela and Vasco Palmeirim. The eight entries that qualified from the two preceding semi-finals competed and the winner, "" performed by Conan Osíris, was selected based on the 50/50 combination of votes of seven regional juries and a public televote. Isaura, Portuguese Eurovision 1983 entrant Armando Gama, Portuguese Eurovision 1993 entrant Anabela, Portuguese Eurovision 2008 entrant Vânia Fernandes, and Portuguese Eurovision 2018 entrant Cláudia Pascoal performed as the interval acts.

At Eurovision 
According to Eurovision rules, all nations with the exceptions of the host country and the "Big Five" (France, Germany, Italy, Spain and the United Kingdom) are required to qualify from one of two semi-finals in order to compete for the final; the top ten countries from each semi-final progress to the final. The European Broadcasting Union (EBU) split up the competing countries into six different pots based on voting patterns from previous contests, with countries with favourable voting histories put into the same pot. On 31 January 2017, a special allocation draw was held which placed each country into one of the two semi-finals, as well as which half of the show they would perform in. Portugal was placed into the first semi-final, to be held on 14 May 2019, and was scheduled to perform in the second half of the show.

Once all the competing songs for the 2019 contest had been released, the running order for the semi-finals was decided by the shows' producers rather than through another draw, so that similar songs were not placed next to each other. Portugal was set to perform in position 15, following the entry from Estonia and before the entry from Greece.

The Portuguese spokesperson, who announced the top 12-point score awarded by the Portuguese jury during the final, was Inês Lopes Gonçalves.

Semi-final

Conan Osíris took part in technical rehearsals on 5 and 9 May, followed by dress rehearsals on 13 and 14 May. This included the jury final on 13 May where the professional juries of each country watched and voted on the competing entries.

The Portuguese performance featured Conan Osíris wearing a green kimono robe with a large ear piece, designed by designer Ruben Osório, performing a choreographed routine on a small staircase with dancer João Reis Moreira, also dressed in green. The LED screens displayed images of red-coloured roses surrounded by black archways. Conan Osíris was joined by two off-stage backing vocalists: Patrícia Antunes and Patricia Silveira.

At the end of the show, Portugal was not announced among the top 10 entries in the first semi-final and therefore failed to qualify to compete in the final. It was later revealed that Portugal placed fifteenth in the semi-final, receiving a total of 51 points: 43 points from the televoting and 8 points from the juries.

Voting
Voting during the three shows involved each country awarding two sets of points from 1-8, 10 and 12: one from their professional jury and the other from televoting. Each nation's jury consisted of five music industry professionals who are citizens of the country they represent, with their names published before the contest to ensure transparency. This jury judged each entry based on: vocal capacity; the stage performance; the song's composition and originality; and the overall impression by the act. In addition, no member of a national jury was permitted to be related in any way to any of the competing acts in such a way that they cannot vote impartially and independently. The individual rankings of each jury member as well as the nation's televoting results were released shortly after the grand final.

Below is a breakdown of points awarded to Portugal and awarded by Portugal in the first semi-final and grand final of the contest, and the breakdown of the jury voting and televoting conducted during the two shows:

Points awarded to Portugal

Points awarded by Portugal

Detailed voting results
The following members comprised the Portuguese jury:
 Ana Lúcia Fernandes Paulo (Ana Paulo; jury chairperson)artist manager
 Hélder Renato Teixeira Coutinho Lopes da Silva (Renato Júnior)composer, music producer
 Ana Cláudia Lopes Gonçalves (Ana Cláudia)singer, musician
 Rúben Matay Leal de Sousa (Matay)singer, entertainer
 Paulo Azevedo Vaz do Casteloradio producer

References

External links
 Official Festival da Canção site

2019
Countries in the Eurovision Song Contest 2019
Eurovision